The 2011–12 Texas Brahmas season was the 11th season in the Central Hockey League for the professional ice hockey franchise in North Richland Hills, Texas.

Regular season

Conference standings

See also
 2011–12 CHL season

References

External links
 2011–12 Texas Brahmas season at Pointstreak

Texas Brahmas
Texas Brahmas